Hazro Tehsil is a tehsil of Attock District in the Punjab Province of Pakistan about 85km away from Islamabad and 7km from GT road. Hazro City is also connected to Islamabad motorway through Chach Interchange. Hazro City is a trading hub for approximately 90 villages and spoken languages are Hindko, Pashto, Urdu, and English. It is a newly created tehsil from parts of the NA-57 constituency of Attock with the capital of Hazro.

History

On 26 October 2006, the Minister of State for Environment, Malik Amin Aslam announced that Rs150 million would be spent on the NA 57 area of Attock including remote areas of Hazro Tehsil for development.
Bahadur Khan
Ababakar
Barazai
Daman
Hameed
Hazro
Jalalia
Kalu Kalan
Kamalpur Musa
Khagwani
Nartopa
Pirdad
Sirka
Tajak
Rangoo
Waisa

Notable people
Yasir Ali
Zubair Ali Zai

See also
Chhachh
Alizai tribe
Tareen Pathan

References

Tehsils in Attock District